Sunil Roul (born 14 October 1998) is an Indian cricketer. He made his Twenty20 debut on 10 January 2021, for Odisha in the 2020–21 Syed Mushtaq Ali Trophy. He made his List A debut on 8 December 2021, for Odisha in the 2021–22 Vijay Hazare Trophy.

References

External links
 

1998 births
Living people
Indian cricketers
Odisha cricketers
People from Cuttack
Cricketers from Odisha